Arabshah (also Romanized as ‘Arabshāh) is a village in Ansar Rural District, in the Central District of Takab County, West Azerbaijan Province, Iran. At the 2006 census, its population was 538, in 104 families.

References 

Populated places in Takab County